Nazir Ahmed Butt  is a retired lieutenant general in the Pakistan Army who served as the 30th president of the National Defence University from 11 April 2016	to 19 December 2016. He also served as Pakistan's military attaché in the US, and military secretary to the prime minister of Pakistan. On 4 March 2023, the government appointed him chairman of the National Accountability Bureau.

Career 
Butt was commissioned in the Frontier Force Regiment, Pakistan Army in 1983. He graduated from the Command and Staff College, and the National Defence University, Pakistan. Prior to his appointment as commander of the XI Corps (Peshawar Corps) in December 2016, he served as commander of the Pakistan Military Academy (PMA) in addition to commanding an infantry division in the Federally Administered Tribal Areas (FATA).

He was promoted to lieutenant general in 2014 and was subsequently appointed as inspector general of Communications and Information Technology at the General Headquarters. Before retiring from the service in 2018, he also commanded a military formation in South Waziristan as a major general.

References 

Recipients of Hilal-i-Imtiaz
Pakistani generals
National Defence University, Pakistan alumni
Graduates of the Staff College, Quetta
Date of birth missing (living people)
Place of birth missing (living people)
Year of birth missing (living people)
Living people
Chairmen of the National Accountability Bureau